The Marengo trial or Marengo case is a trial of leading members of the Mocro Maffia, a Dutch-Moroccan criminal organisation. Seventeen suspects are standing trial for involvement in a number of murders and attempted murders. The name of the trial was picked at random by a computer and relates to a fabric named marengo.

Suspects
The principal suspect in the trial is Ridouan Taghi, considered to be the sponsor of the organisation. Saïd Razzouki, the alleged right-hand man of Taghi, was arrested in Medellín, Colombia on 7 February 2020, but had not been extradited to the Netherlands at the start of the trial. He was extradited in December 2021.

Accusations
The charges in these cases include a number of murders and attempted murders from 2015 to 2017:

 The murder of Ronald Bakker (59) on 9 September 2015. He was murdered in front of his home in Huizen. He is said to have provided the detectives with information about customers of the store in Nieuwegein where he worked.
 Preparations for causing an explosion in the spy shop in Nieuwegein, where Bakker worked. Taghi suspected the company of collaborating with the police and the judiciary. This was evident from messages intercepted by the police via PGP telephones between Taghi and co-defendants, which could only be cracked years later.
 Preparations for the assassination of Fachtali and the assassination of Samuel Erraghib in the period from 1 March to 17 April 2016
 Murder of Samir Erraghib on 17 April 2016 in IJsselstein. According to intercepted messages (PGPs), Taghi assumed that Erraghib passed on information about his organization to the police. Erraghib's 7-year-old daughter was present when he was murdered.
Murder of Abdelkader Belhadj on 9 May 2016.
Murder of Ranko Scekic on 22 June 2016. Scekic was murdered just before he had to testify in a criminal case against Taghi in Utrecht. He would have been part of a group that prepared murders on behalf of Taghi. The Public Prosecution Service later announced about this murder that *Taghi wrote via the PGP message service shortly after the killing "Hahaha, that hydrocephalus is no longer alive. He has received 5 or 6 bullets in his head".
Attempted murder of Martin Kok on 2 July 2016, in Amsterdam.
Attempted assassination of Abdelkarim Ahabad on 11 October 2016.
Attempted murder of Khalid Badho on 5 December 2016 in Rotterdam.
Attempted murder of Martin Kok on 8 December 2016 in Amsterdam.
Murder of Martin Kok on 8 December 2016 in Laren. As a crime reporter, Kok wrote on his website about Ridouan Taghi, Richard R. ('Rico de Chileen'), and Naoufal 'Noffel' F. as a murderous triumvirate.
Preparations for the assassination of Khalid Hmidat in January 2017.
Murder of Hakim Changachi on 12 January 2017 in Utrecht. According to justice, Changachi was not the target of the murder, but actually Khalid Hmidat. A few days later, another assassination attempt followed, but the target 'Imo' noticed his attackers in time and alerted the police.

Crown witness
A breakthrough was made when Nabil B., one of the suspects, offered to give a statement. Shortly after, Nabil's non-criminal brother was murdered, after which Nabil pulled out, later changing his decision. His attorney, Derk Wiersum, was killed on 18 September 2019.

The investigative journalist and crime reporter Peter R. de Vries was supporting the crown witness in the trial. On 6 July 2021, he was shot in the head after leaving the television studio of RTL Boulevard in Amsterdam where he had appeared as a guest. He was taken to a hospital in critical condition. On 15 July he died as a result of the shooting.

References 

Mocro Maffia
Organized crime events in the Netherlands
Trials in the Netherlands